Jonathan Dunford (born 30 October 1959 in Trenton, New Jersey) is an American violist specialising in the baroque repertoire.

Biography 

After studying the viol at the New England Conservatory of Music in Boston, Dunford was awarded a scholarship in 1980 for further training by Jordi Savall at the Schola Cantorum Basiliensis.

He obtained his mastery of viola da gamba in 1987 in Boston then his State Diploma of Ancient Music in 1989 in France.

Jonathan Dunford has been living in Paris since 1985, is married to the gambist Sylvia Abramowicz and taught at the Conservatoire de Strasbourg between 1990 and 1997 and also at the Conservatoire de Metz. He has been teaching at the Conservatory of Saint-Cloud since 2013.

He has conducted extensive research at the Bibliothèque nationale de France on music for viola da gamba.

In 2004, he was appointed workshop leader for viola da gamba for the data base "Philidor" at the Centre de musique baroque de Versailles. He has published numerous articles on the viola da gamba (Goldberg, l'Œil, record booklets) and regularly participates in radio programs (France Musique, Radio Bleu, etc.) and television programs (Mezzo).

In 2016 he founded his own digital label "Astres Disques".

Jonathan Dunford plays on a bass viola da gamba built in 1741 by Parisian luthier Solomon.

His son Thomas Dunford, born in Paris in 1988, plays the lute and theorbo and participates in recordings and in early music festivals.

Discography (selection) 
 1992: Pièces de Viole en manuscrit (excerpt from Manuscrit 1111 of the Bibliothèque Nationale de Paris) with pieces by Dietrich Stöeffken, Tobias Hume, Daniel Farrant, Thomas Ford, Nicolas Hotman, August Verdufen, Jean Lacquemant (Dubuisson), John Jenkins and several anonymous Germans
 1996: Le Sieur Dubuisson, music by Jean Lacquemant better known under the name  Sieur Dubuisson
 1998: Suites pour une et trois lyra-violes by William Lawes
 Pièces de Viole en Tablature by De Machy or Demachy
 Suites pour viole seule by Ditrich Stöeffken
 Suites pour viole seule / Concerts à deux violes esgales by Jean de Sainte-Colombe
 1997: Tombeau pour Mr. de Sainte-Colombe le père Sainte-Colombe le fils Adès (Universal)
 2000 & 2002: Pièces de viole inédites  - Marin Marais Accord-Universal
 2007: Le Tombeau de Marin Marais AS Productions, Paris (distribution Abeille Musique)
 2011: Les surprises de l'amour de Rameau, transcriptions de M. Hesse Alpha Productions, Paris distribution Harmonia Mundi
 2011: Love is the Cause of My Mourning, Scottish tunes for Baroque Guitar and Viola da Gamba Alpha Productions, Paris distribution Harmonia Mundi
 2011: Bertrand de Bacilly, L'Art D'Orner Le Beau Chant Saphir Productions, Paris
 2014: Alfonso Ferrabosco, Ayres & Lessons for the Lyra Viol ARION
 2015: Marin Marais, Suites à Deux Violes (1686) Musica Ficta
 2015 : Music for the Viol Lyra-Way - Musique inédite de Jenkins et Simpson (uniquement téléchargement) - Astres Disques
 2016 : Le Sieur de Sainte-Colombe - Suites for Solo Viola da Gamba (uniquement téléchargement) - Astres Disques
 2016 : Telemann - Fantasies for Solo Viola da Gamba - (uniquement téléchargement) - Astres Disques
 2016 - Jean-Baptiste Cappus: Pièces de Viole - 1730 - (uniquement téléchargement) - Astres Disques
2016  Meditation sur la vie et la mort - Astres Disques
2016 Gervise Gerrarde: Paven - Single - Astres Disques
2016  Le Sieur de Sainte-Colombe: Le Retour - Single - Astres Disques
2017  La Princesse Palatine: Portrait d'encre et de notes - Astres Disques
2018  The Best Of: Marin Marais - Charles Hurel - Astres Disques
2019  Paris, 1666 - Astres Disques
2020  Demachy - Pièces De Viole - 1685 - Astres Disques
2020 John Merro's Book: Music for Lyra Viol from 17th Century England - Astres Disques
2020  Mr. Marsh's Lyra-Viol Book - Astres Disques
2020  Thomas Morley: Fantasies to Two Voices - Astres Disques
2021 Louis de Caix d'Hervelois: Sonata No. 3 in B Minor - Astres Disques
2021  Marin Marais: Les folies originelles - Single - Astres Disques
2021  Sainte-Colombe le fils - Astres Disques

Bibliography 
 Jonathan Dunford and Pierre-Gilles Girault. Un portrait du musicien Marin Marais par Jean Dieu de Saint-Jean au musée du château de Blois ("a portrait of the musician Marin Marais by Jean Dieu de Saint-Jean in the musée du château de Blois"). Les cahiers du château et des musées de Blois, no.37, Dec 2006 – June 2007, (p. 15–21).
 Le Mystère Saint-Colombe on Classicalacarte.net

References

External links 
  Jonathan Dunford's website
 Jonathan Dunford
 Jonathan Dunford, invité de la Matinale on France Musique (30 July 2016)
 Discographie de l’Ensemble A 2 Violes Esgales
 Jonathan Dunford plays Demachy on YouTube

1959 births
Living people
Musicians from Trenton, New Jersey
American violists
American music educators
Educators from New Jersey